Local elections were held in Santa Rosa City on May 13, 2019 within the Philippine general election. The voters elected for the elective local posts in the city: the mayor, vice mayor, and ten councilors.

Overview
Incumbent Mayor Dan Fernandez decided not to seek reelection as he would instead seek a comeback to the Congress representing the 1st District of Laguna. He switched position with incumbent Representative Arlene B. Arcillas once again, who this time ran for Mayor under PDP-Laban. His opponents were Alicia Lazaga of Pederalismo ng Dugong Dakilang Samahan and Malitlit Barangay Captain Cesar Hernandez, an independent.

Mayor Arcillas's brother, Arnold, ran for re-election under PDP-Laban. His lone opponent was his predecessor, former Vice Mayor Arnel Gomez pf Nationalist People's Coalition.

Candidates

Administration ticket

Opposition ticket

Other

Results

Mayor
Incumbent Dan Fernandez ran for Congress. His party nominated incumbent Congresswoman Arlene Arcillas.

Vice Mayor
Incumbent Arnold Arcillas ran for reelection but lost

Councilors

|-bgcolor=black
|colspan=8|

References

2019 Philippine local elections
Elections in Santa Rosa, Laguna
May 2019 events in the Philippines
2019 elections in Calabarzon